Francis Willard "Fanny" Niehaus (March 16, 1902 - March 1985) was a professional football player from Seymour, Indiana. After attending high school in Akron, Ohio, Niehaus attended Washington & Jefferson College. After college, he made his professional debut in the early National Football League with the Akron Pros in 1925. He later played for the Pottsville Maroons in 1926 before ending his professional football career.

References

External links
 

1902 births
American football running backs
Akron Pros players
Players of American football from Indiana
Pottsville Maroons players
Washington & Jefferson College alumni
Washington & Jefferson Presidents football players
1985 deaths